Brajraj Kshatriya Birbar Chamupati Singh Mahapatra (15 October 1921 - 30 November 2015) was the final surviving royal of the British Raj-era "princely states" Tigiria State of Orissa.

Brajraj was born on 15 October 1921, the son of Sudarshan Kshatriya Birbar Chamupati Singh Mahapatra, Raja of Tigiria. After taking a diploma from Rajkumar College in Raipur in 1940, he married Rani Rasmanjari Devi, a princess of Sonepur, with whom he had six children.

References

Indian maharajas
1921 births
2015 deaths
People from Odisha